Woolpunda is a locality in the Riverland region of South Australia. It is on the south side of the Sturt Highway west of Kingston on Murray. The Woolpunda irrigation scheme was established in the 1920s in the northwestern part of the Hundred of Moorook.

The locality has previously had a school house and hall. It still has a water tower positioned on high ground. The pump station to lift water from the Murray River is now in the newer locality of Wigley Flat. The land is used for a mixture of broadacre grain farming and more intensive irrigated fruit and vegetable crops, including grapes and olives.

References

Towns in South Australia